Anton Eliel Mickelsson (15 May 1886 – 10 January 1963) was a Finnish sea captain and politician, born in Korpo. He was a member of the Parliament of Finland from 1919 to 1922, representing the Social Democratic Party of Finland (SDP).

References

1886 births
1963 deaths
People from Pargas
People from Turku and Pori Province (Grand Duchy of Finland)
Swedish-speaking Finns
Social Democratic Party of Finland politicians
Members of the Parliament of Finland (1919–22)